Georgios Tzelepis (born 12 November 1999) is a Greek professional footballer who plays as a goalkeeper.

References

1999 births
Living people
Greek footballers
Greece youth international footballers
Football League (Greece) players
Super League Greece players
Panthrakikos F.C. players
Xanthi F.C. players
Ergotelis F.C. players
Association football goalkeepers
Footballers from Komotini